Andy De Bont (born 7 February 1974) is an English former footballer who played as a goalkeeper. He played in the Football League for both Hartlepool and Hereford United.

Career
De Bont began his career as a trainee with Wolverhampton Wanderers, but despite signing professional terms with the club was never to play a first team match for them.

He made his senior debut in 1995 during a loan spell at Hartlepool United. De Bont then made a second loan move in February 1996 when he reunited with his former Wolves manager Graham Turner now at Third Division Hereford United, a move during which he made eight appearances.

Unable to break into the Wolves team he made a permanent move to Hereford in Summer 1996 on a free transfer. He was a regular starter in the team during the first half of the 1996–97 season, that ultimately ended in relegation from the Football League.

He remained with the Bulls for a further season in the non-league before spells at Stourbridge, Moor Green and Willenhall Town.

References

External links

1974 births
Living people
People from Wolverhampton
English footballers
Wolverhampton Wanderers F.C. players
Hartlepool United F.C. players
Hereford United F.C. players
Stourbridge F.C. players
Moor Green F.C. players
Willenhall Town F.C. players
English Football League players
Association football goalkeepers